The Yasar Dogu Tournament 2009, was a wrestling event held in Ankara, Turkey between 7 and 8 February 2009. This tournament was held as 37th.

This international tournament includes competition includes competition in both men's and women's freestyle wrestling. This ranking tournament was held in honor of the two time Olympic Champion, Yaşar Doğu.

Medal table

Medal overview

Men's freestyle

Participating nations

References 

Yasar Dogu 2009
2009 in sport wrestling
Sports competitions in Ankara
Yaşar Doğu Tournament
International wrestling competitions hosted by Turkey